This is a complete list of Slovenian cardinals of the Roman Catholic Church.

Slovenia
Cardinals
Slovenian cardinals